Rafael Casero Moreno (born 9 October 1976 in Valencia) is a Spanish former professional road bicycle racer, who rode professionally between 2000 and 2006. The brother of Ángel Casero, Rafael Casero now works as a directeur sportif for UCI Continental team .

Major results

2002
 1st Mountains classification Tour of the Basque Country
2003
 Volta a la Comunitat Valenciana
1st Mountains classification
1st Stage 2
 2nd Road race, National Road Championships
 4th Overall Volta a Catalunya

References

External links 

1976 births
Living people
Spanish male cyclists
Sportspeople from Valencia
Cyclists from the Valencian Community